1996 Verdy Kawasaki season

Review and events

League results summary

League results by round

Competitions

Domestic results

J.League

Emperor's Cup

J.League Cup

Suntory Cup

Player statistics

 † player(s) joined the team after the opening of this season.

Transfers

In:

Out:

Transfers during the season

In
 Argel (from Internacional on May)
 Keiji Ishizuka (loan return from Mamoré)
 Magrão (from Coritiba FC on August)

Out
 Keiji Ishizuka (loan to Mamoré)
 Ruy Ramos (to Kyoto Purple Sanga)
 Donizete (on August)
 Shinji Fujiyoshi (to Kyoto Purple Sanga)
 Caíco (on October)
 Shingi Ono (loan to Denso)

Awards

J.League Top Scorer:  Kazuyoshi Miura
J.League Best XI:  Kazuyoshi Miura

Notes

References

Other pages
 J. League official site
 Tokyo Verdy official site

Verdy Kawasaki
Tokyo Verdy seasons